Forestvale is a rural locality in the Maranoa Region, Queensland, Australia.

Road infrastructure
The Warrego Highway passes to the south.

References 

Maranoa Region
Localities in Queensland